The Gas Act 1986 (Chapter 44) created the framework for privatisation of the gas supply industry in Great Britain. This legislation would  be replacing the British Gas Corporation (government or state ownership) with British Gas plc (private ownership). The Act also established a licensing regime, a Gas Consumers’ Council, and a regulator for the industry called the Office of Gas Supply (OFGAS).

Background 
The liberalisation and privatisation of the energy markets in the United Kingdom began under the tenure of Margaret Thatcher’s Conservative Government in the 1980s. This has been called the Thatcher-Lawson agenda, due to the key role of Nigel Lawson, the Chancellor of the Exchequer (1983–89) in the Thatcher ministry. There was a perceived need to reduce the inefficient state control of the energy sector and to introduce a market-oriented system through privatisation. Access to the energy market would be given to more organisations, improving competition and reducing prices for the consumer.

Gas Act 1986 
The Gas Act 1986 received royal assent on 25 July 1986. The long title of the Act is:

Provisions 
The provisions of the Act comprise 68 sections in three parts, plus eight schedules.

 Part I: Gas supply
 Sections 1 to 4: Introductory – the Director-General of Gas Supply, the Gas Consumers’ Council
 Sections 5 to 8: Authorization of gas supply – authorization of public gas suppliers, authorization of other persons
 Sections 9 to 15: Supply of gas by public gas suppliers – general powers and duties, fixing of tariffs, public gas supply code
 Sections 16 to 18: Supply of gas by public gas suppliers and others – quality standards, safety regulations
 Sections 19 to 22: Use by other persons of pipe-lines belonging to public gas suppliers – acquisition of rights to use pipe-lines, construction of pipe-lines, increasing capacity of pipe-lines
 Sections 23 to 27: Modification of public gas suppliers’ authorizations
 Sections 28 to 30: Securing compliance of public gas suppliers
 Sections 31 to 33: Investigation of complaints – the duties of the Director-General of Gas Supply and the Gas Consumers’ Council to investigate certain matters
 Sections 34 to 39: Other functions of the Director-General of Gas Supply – general functions, the publication of information and advice, annual and other reports
 Sections 40 to 41: Other functions of the Gas Consumers’ Council – the duty to advise the Director-General of Gas Supply, annual reports
 Sections 42 to 44: Miscellaneous
 Sections 45 to 48: Supplemental
 Part II: Transfer of the undertakings of the British Gas Corporation
 Sections 49 to 61: Vesting of property of British Gas Corporation, British Gas plc stock, government holding in the successor company, dissolution of the British Gas Corporation
 Part III: Miscellaneous and general
 Sections 62 to 68: Financial provisions, general interpretation, amendments, transitional provisions, savings and repeals, commencement and extent
of Schedules 1 to 9

Effects of the Act 

The Gas Act of 1986 repealed the whole of the Gas Act 1960, and parts of the Gas Act 1965, as well as parts of the Gas Act 1972.

Section 1 of the 1986 Act established the Director-General of Gas Supply and the Office of Gas Regulation (OFGAS). This was an economic regulator, independent of Government but accountable to Parliament. This arrangement separated the regulatory decisions from political control and aimed to give greater long-term regulatory certainty and to encourage market entry and investment. The regulator has since become the Office of Gas and Electricity Markets (OFGEM).

The Gas Act 1986 was one of the first Thatcher government privatization efforts. The first had been British Telecom in 1984. When British Gas plc was floated on the London Stock Exchange on 8 December 1986, it traded at 135 pence per share, valuing British Gas plc at £9 billion.

The privatization of gas supply and the opening up of the market was one of the factors in the UK's 'Dash for Gas' – the shift from coal-fired to gas-fired power plants in the electricity industry – in the early 1990s. Other factors included regulatory changes by the EU that facilitated the use of gas, technological advances that increased the efficiency of combined cycle gas turbines (CCGT), increased North Sea gas production, and the environmental benefits of reduced carbon dioxide and sulphur dioxide emissions.

In 1994, British Gas plc was reorganized into British Gas and Transco. British Gas owned the offshore supplies, storage, and supply contracts. The onshore pipeline system, the National Transmission System (NTS), was independently operated by Transco.

In preparation for the further opening up of the gas markets to competition in 1996, British Gas plc went through a process of restructuring to separate the company into five new divisions, which entailed a substantial reduction of staff.

The Gas Act of 1986 does not apply to Northern Ireland.

Later amending Acts 
The Gas Act 1995 amended Parts I and III of the Gas Act 1986, establishing provisions for requiring the owners of certain gas processing facilities to make them available to other organizations.

Section 1 of the Utilities Act 2000 established the Office of Gas and Electricity Markets (OFGEM), which merged and abolished the Office of Gas Supply (OFGAS) and Office of Electricity Regulation (OFFER).

See also 
 Energy policy of the United Kingdom
 Energy in the United Kingdom

References 

United Kingdom Acts of Parliament 1986
Natural gas industry in the United Kingdom